The Great Heroes, also known as The Story of the Great Heroes, is a four-part Hong Kong film adapted from Louis Cha's novel The Return of the Condor Heroes. Parts 1 and 2 were released in 1960, and parts 3 and 4 were released in 1961.

Cast
 Patrick Tse as Yang Guo
 Nam Hung as Xiaolongnü
 Lam Kau as Guo Jing
 Chan Wai-yue as Huang Rong
 Geung Chung-ping
 Kong Suet
 Shih Kien
 Leung Siu-kam
 Szema Wah Lung
 Lee Yuet-ching
 Mui Lan
 Michael Lai
 Siu Hon-sang
 Cheung Sang
 Leung Siu-bo
 Seung-gun Gwan-wai
 Yuen Siu-tien
 Ko Lo-chuen
 Hui Ying-ying
 Ho Ging-fan

External links
 
 
 
 

1960 films
1961 films
Films based on works by Jin Yong
Films released in separate parts
Hong Kong martial arts films
Films based on The Return of the Condor Heroes
Wuxia films